Benjamin Evans House is a historic home located in Nescopeck Township, Luzerne County, Pennsylvania.  It was built about 1855, and is a two-story, frame dwelling in the Italian Villa style. It consists of two offset cubic structures, and sits on a stone foundation.  It features a belvedere, a projecting main roof cornice, and three porches.  Also on the property are a barn and coal shed built by the Works Progress Administration, the ruins of a grist mill foundation, and an abandoned road with stone arch bridge.

It was added to the National Register of Historic Places in 1983.

References

Houses on the National Register of Historic Places in Pennsylvania
Italianate architecture in Pennsylvania
Houses completed in 1855
Houses in Luzerne County, Pennsylvania
National Register of Historic Places in Luzerne County, Pennsylvania